Steven Ralph Arlin (September 25, 1945 – August 17, 2016) was an American pitcher in Major League Baseball who played for the San Diego Padres and Cleveland Indians for six seasons.

College star
Born in Seattle, Arlin was a collegiate star at Ohio State University and was a star in the College World Series. In a 1965 semifinal game against Washington State, he struck out 20 batters in 15 innings, both CWS records, in a 1–0 complete game victory for the Buckeyes. Ohio State, however, lost the final game to an Arizona State team that featured Rick Monday and Sal Bando. The following year in 1966, Arlin led Ohio State to the title and was named the CWS most valuable player.

In his two years with the Buckeyes, Arlin posted a 24–3 record with 294 strikeouts. His 165 strikeouts in 1965 remains an Ohio State single-season record; it and the career strikeout record had been set by Paul Ebert in the 1950s. Arlin's number 22 was the first to be retired by the Ohio State baseball team.

In 1978, Arlin was inducted into the Ohio State Varsity O Hall of Fame.  In , Arlin was a finalist for the first induction class of the College Baseball Hall of Fame.  In  he was inducted.

Minor Leagues
In  the Philadelphia Phillies drafted Arlin in the first round (13th overall) in the secondary phase of the amateur draft. On July 25, 1967, he pitched a no-hitter in the Eastern League. Arlin also pitched in the Phillies’ farm system in  before being selected by the San Diego Padres in the expansion draft.

Major Leagues
In those seasons, however, he posted earned run averages of 3.48 in 1971 and 3.60 in 1972. The 1972 season was an especially curious one for Arlin: he pitched a one-hitter, three two-hitters (in one, on July 18 against the Phillies, he had a no-hitter broken up by Denny Doyle with two out in the ninth— the closest a Padre had come to pitching a no-hitter until Joe Musgrove in 2021), and a 10-inning stint in which he allowed only one hit, yet he finished 10–21. In  Arlin recorded a personal best 11 victories against 14 losses, but with a 5.10 ERA—nearly a run and a half above his career ERA to that point.

Arlin was primarily a starting pitcher in the major leagues (141 games, 123 starts) but on June 9, 1974, he did pick up his one and only MLB save.

Midway into the  season, the Padres traded Arlin to the Cleveland Indians for two players to be named later. The Indians completed the trade a week later by sending pitchers Brent Strom and Terry Ley to the Padres. After closing out the season, Arlin, a dental student, retired from baseball and went into the dental profession. During his Major League career, Arlin won 34 games (11 of which were shutouts) while losing 67, with 463 strikeouts and a 4.33 earned run average in 788 innings pitched.

Arlin's grandfather, Harold Arlin, was the first broadcaster ever to call a game on radio, an August 5, 1921 game between the Phillies and Pittsburgh Pirates at Forbes Field. Harold Arlin also broadcast the first-ever football game to be called over the radio months later, a college football game between Pitt and West Virginia.

Death
Arlin died in San Diego, California on August 17, 2016, at the age of 70.

See also
 Ohio State Buckeyes baseball retired numbers

Sources

External links
, or Retrosheet
Lost in the Ninth: No-Hitters Broken Up in the Ninth Inning Since 1961

1945 births
2016 deaths
All-American college baseball players
American dentists
Bakersfield Bears players
Baseball players from Seattle
Cleveland Indians players
National College Baseball Hall of Fame inductees
College World Series Most Outstanding Player Award winners
Columbus Jets players
Major League Baseball pitchers
Ohio State Buckeyes baseball players
Ohio State University College of Dentistry alumni
Reading Phillies players
Salt Lake City Bees players
San Diego Padres players
San Diego Padres (minor league) players
Tidewater Tides players
20th-century dentists